Kobben (renamed to A-1 in 1913) was the first submarine of the Royal Norwegian Navy. It was delivered on 28 November 1909. The boat was stricken in 1926 and scrapped in 1933. It was succeeded
by the A class.

References

Submarine classes
1909 ships